"Babe" is a song recorded by American country music duo Sugarland, featuring guest vocals from American singer-songwriter Taylor Swift. It was released by Big Machine Records on April 20, 2018, as the second single from Sugarland's sixth studio album, Bigger (2018). "Babe" is a midtempo country pop ballad and breakup song. It peaked at number 2 on the Billboard Digital Songs chart, number 8 on the Billboard Hot Country Songs, and at number 72 on the Billboard Hot 100.

The song was originally written by Swift and Pat Monahan of the American band Train, for Swift's fourth studio album, Red (2012); however, it did not make the final track-list. Swift re-recorded the song for her second re-recorded album, Red (Taylor's Version) (2021).

Background

Patrick Monahan, the founding member of rock band Train, first spoke about the song during a 2013 interview with ABC News Radio. He said that when he asked Swift about collaborating on a song for Train's next album, she asked him to co-write a song for her album Red (2012). Ultimately, the song was not included on the album, but when Swift decided to put out a deluxe version of Red, Monahan thought it would finally be released. The song was not previously recorded.

The album's track list, which was released on April 12, 2018, shows that "Babe" is the only song on the album not co-written by Kristian Bush and Jennifer Nettles of Sugarland. It also marks the second song Swift has written for a country act since making her full transition to pop in 2014, following Little Big Town's "Better Man", as well as the first country song on which she is credited as an artist since that time.

Sugarland told reporters backstage at the 53rd Academy of Country Music Awards that the collaboration came about after Swift, who is a Sugarland fan, called the duo wanting to work with them. "She was gracious enough to reach out to us when she heard we were coming back together and doing a record," Bush said. "She said, 'I have a song, would you like to do it?' And we said, 'Uh, yeah!' I was a little anxious. I didn't want to mess it up!" Nettles added: "But she loved it and wanted [us] to be a part of it, which is exciting. She said, 'I have a song,' and we said, 'Okay. Send it over.'" The duo found it to be an unusual experience, since they have never featured anybody on their past albums. "So we weren't really used to sorting through that and we didn't want to mess it up. We didn't tell anybody about it until we got finished and she liked it, thank God." In a video Swift posted on Instagram, she expressed that she is delighted that the song "gets its own life" and that "Sugarland wanted to record it and has done such a great job with it".

Swift revealed in August 2021 that she will be recording a solo rendition of "Babe" for the 2021 re-recording of Red.

Composition
"Babe" is an acoustic, midtempo country ballad about breaking up. According to Rolling Stones Brittney McKenna, the "foot-stomping" song bears a resemblance to Swift's Speak Now era. Nettles handles the lead vocals while Swift contributes to the song's backing vocals, which can be heard echoing in the chorus and the bridge. Lyrically, the song addresses an unfaithful lover.

Commercial performance
The song debuted  at No. 27 on Country Airplay dated April 28, 2018, The following week it was released for sale, and the song reached No. 8 on Hot Country Songs with 38,000 copies in the first sales week. The song peaked at number 72 on the Billboard Hot 100 chart and at number two on Digital Song Sales chart. It has sold 166,000 copies in the United States as of November 2018. Additionally the song peaked at number 94 in Canada and number 64 in Scotland.

Music video
The trailer for the music video aired during the 2018 CMT Music Awards and was uploaded to Sugarland's YouTube channel on June 6, 2018, while the official music video premiered on June 9. Swift had the original idea for the video's concept, and as stated per the Sugarland duo themselves, they all got together before the video shoot to collaborate on ideas. To date the video has over 30 million views on YouTube.

Synopsis
The video, directed by Anthony Mandler, features Brandon Routh, Jennifer Nettles and Taylor Swift in primary roles. Routh and Nettles are a married couple while Swift plays the role of a secretary who is having an affair with her married boss (Routh). Routh is shown to be an unfaithful husband throughout the clip and is, ultimately, discovered by Nettles. However, it is later revealed that both women were victims, with Nettles being cheated on and Swift being told by Routh that he loves her and has written love letters to her, but later abandons her, breaking both women's hearts. The video ends with Routh leaving Swift's house to find his front doors locked and his belongings thrown out on the lawn. Nettles, now alone and free, lies down to go to bed, ready to enjoy her new life, and Routh leaves, as Kristian Bush, playing their neighbor, witnesses the whole thing while walking his dog. Swift's attire in the music video was compared to that of character Joan Holloway from the television series Mad Men.

Awards and nominations

Live performances
Sugarland performed the song for the first time on Live with Kelly and Ryan on May 8, 2018. On June 6, 2018, they performed it on The Today Show live from Blake Shelton's bar, Ole Red. The song is also included in the Still the Same Tour set list. Swift included the song on her pre-show playlist on her Reputation Stadium Tour and sang it as the surprise song at her Cleveland show. Sugarland joined Swift as the special guest at the second show in Arlington on the tour, where they performed the song together live for the first time.

Credits and personnel
Credits adapted from Tidal.

 Kristian Bush – producer, vocals, acoustic guitar
 Jennifer Nettles – vocals, producer
 Taylor Swift – vocals, songwriter 
 Patrick Monahan – songwriter
 Brandon Bush – producer, keyboard, mixing assistance
 Julian Raymond – producer
 Zoe Rosen – producer
 Brianna Steinitz – producer
 Adam Chignon – mix engineering
 Ted Jensen – master engineer
 Tom Tapley – engineer
 Lars Fox – engineer
 Nik Karpen – mixing assistance
 Sean Badum – record engineering assistance
 Kevin Kane – record engineering assistance
 Paul Bushnell – bass
 Victor Indrizzo – drums
 Tom Bukovac – electric guitar
 Chris Lord-Alge – mixing
 Justin Schipper – steel guitar

Charts

Weekly charts

Year-end charts

Certifications

Release history

"Babe (Taylor's Version)"

Swift re-recorded "Babe", subtitled "(Taylor's Version) (From the Vault)", for her second re-recorded album, Red (Taylor's Version), released on November 12, 2021, through Republic Records. Swift posted a snippet of the re-recording on Tumblr a day before the album's release. "Babe (Taylor's Version)" is a ska-pop song that features trumpets, saxophones, and flutes that were absent from Sugarland's version. It includes additional, repetitive lyrics "What about your promises, promises, promises?" on the background.

Credits and personnel
Credits adapted from Tidal.
 Taylor Swift – vocals, songwriting, production
 Patrick Monahan – songwriting
 Jack Antonoff – production, acoustic guitar, bass, electric guitar, keyboards, mellotron, percussion, programming, drums, engineering, recording
 Mikey Freedom Hart – acoustic guitar, celesta, Hammond B3, electric guitar, slide guitar, synthesizer, engineering
 Sean Hutchinson – drums, percussion, engineering
 Evan Smith – flute, saxophone, engineering
 Michael Riddleberger – percussion, engineering
 Cole Kamen-Green – trumpet, engineering
 Serban Ghenea – mixing
 Bryce Bordone – mix engineering
 David Hart – engineering
 John Rooney – engineering, engineering assistance
 Laura Sisk – engineering, recording
 Jon Sher – engineering assistance
 Lauren Marquez – engineering assistance

Charts

References

External links
 

2018 singles
2018 songs
2010s ballads
Big Machine Records singles
Country ballads
Music videos directed by Anthony Mandler
Pop ballads
Songs about infidelity
Songs written by Pat Monahan
Songs written by Taylor Swift
Song recordings produced by Taylor Swift
Song recordings produced by Jack Antonoff
Sugarland songs
Taylor Swift songs
Vocal collaborations
Ska songs